Venice Township is located in Madison County, Illinois, in the United States. As of the 2010 census, its population was 5,650 and it contained 2,728 housing units.

History
Venice Township was named from the village of Venice in 1876.

Geography

Demographics

References

External links
City-data.com
Illinois State Archives

Townships in Madison County, Illinois
Townships in Illinois